This list of the tallest buildings and structures in Southampton ranks skyscrapers and structures in Southampton, England.

The city's tallest structures are the  container port cranes. The tallest inhabitable structure is the  Moresby Tower, although several others are planned that will exceed this.

Tallest buildings and structures
An equal sign (=) following a rank indicates the same height between two or more buildings.

Tallest under construction, approved and proposed

Approved and under construction

Proposed
Buildings that have been applicated but haven't received planning permission.

Cancelled
This lists proposals for the construction of buildings in Southampton that were planned to rise at least , which were rejected, never materialised or which were otherwise withdrawn. Also includes buildings On Hold for more than 5 years.

Former buildings

External links

References

 
Southampton
Tallest